Archibald Little may refer to,
Alicia Little (1845–1926), better known as Mrs. Archibald Little, English travel writer known for her works and photography in China in the 1880s
Archibald John Little, English merchant in China
Archibald Little (politician) (1837–1922), provincial politician in Ontario, Canada